Thayetchaung  is a town in the Taninthayi Division, southernmost part of Myanmar.

External links
[ East Satellite map at Maplandia.com]

Populated places in Tanintharyi Region
Township capitals of Myanmar